The Spies is a British television series produced by the BBC in 1966. The main stars were Dinsdale Landen and Simon Oates as counter espionage agents Richard Cadell and Anthony Kelly, together with Peter Arne as Russian agent Copic.

A spin-off or rebranding of the previous 1965 series The Mask of Janus, The Spies was a more conventional espionage thriller series than its predecessor, being more explicitly concerned with the actual operations of British secret service agents stationed in the fictional European country Amalia. The series can be viewed as being a BBC attempt to match the popularity of the ITV action show Danger Man.

Most of this show was wiped (probably in the 1970s) by the BBC; only one episode is known to exist according to www.lostshows.com.

External links

BBC television dramas
Espionage television series
Lost BBC episodes
1960s British drama television series
1966 British television series debuts
1966 British television series endings
Black-and-white British television shows
English-language television shows